Mark John Hamburger (born Feb. 5, 1987) is an American former professional baseball pitcher who played in Major League Baseball (MLB) for the Texas Rangers in 2011.

Early life
Hamburger attended Mounds View High School in Arden Hills, Minnesota and was a multi-sport athlete playing basketball, rugby, tennis, football, and baseball. After graduating from high school in 2005, Hamburger attended and played baseball at Mesabi Range College where he posted an 11-0 record and a 0.65 ERA.

Professional career

Minnesota Twins
The summer following Hamburger's season of collegiate baseball, he attended a try-out for the Minnesota Twins that was held at the Metrodome in 2007. Hamburger was signed by the Twins after the try-out, received a $2,000 signing bonus, and was assigned to the Gulf Coast League Twins.

During the 2008 season, Hamburger was assigned to the Elizabethton Twins where he won closer of the year.

Texas Rangers
After two years in the Twins' minor league system, Hamburger was traded to the Texas Rangers in exchange for Eddie Guardado on August 25, 2008.

Hamburger was called up to the majors for the first time on August 30, 2011.

San Diego Padres
He was claimed off of waivers by the San Diego Padres on June 25, 2012, and placed on their Triple-A team, the Tucson Padres.

Houston Astros
For the second time in 2012, he was claimed off waivers by the Houston Astros on July 21.

In February 2013, Hamburger received a 50-game suspension without pay after a second violation of the Minor League Drug Prevention and Treatment Program for a drug of abuse.

Second Stint with Twins
On September 4, 2013, the Minnesota Twins signed Hamburger to a minor league deal. He elected free agency on November 6, 2015.

St. Paul Saints
On April 12, 2016, Hamburger signed with the St. Paul Saints.

Melbourne Aces
Hamburger played the Australian Baseball League 2016-17 season (November - February) with the Melbourne Aces that won the regular season but lost the final to the Brisbane Bandits. He was the league leader for ERA (1.90).

Second stint with Saints
On April 20, 2017, Hamburger signed with the St. Paul Saints of the American Association of Independent Professional Baseball. On September 11, 2017, Hamburger was traded to the Somerset Patriots of the Atlantic League of Professional Baseball. On September 29, 2017, Hamburger was traded back to the St. Paul Saints.

Second stint with Aces
Hamburger returned to the Melbourne Aces of the Australian Baseball League for the 2017/18 season.

New Britain Bees
On March 23, 2018, Hamburger was traded by the St. Paul Saints to the New Britain Bees of the Atlantic League of Professional Baseball. He became a free agent following the 2018 season.

References

From open tryout with buddy (Justin Hemauer) to the big leagues.

External links

1987 births
Living people
Bakersfield Blaze players
Baseball players from Minnesota
Clinton LumberKings players
Elizabethton Twins players
Frisco RoughRiders players
Gulf Coast Twins players
Hickory Crawdads players
Leones de Ponce players
Major League Baseball pitchers
Melbourne Aces players
New Britain Bees players
New Britain Rock Cats players
Oklahoma City RedHawks players
Rochester Red Wings players
Round Rock Express players
Somerset Patriots players
St. Paul Saints players
Texas Rangers players
Tiburones de La Guaira players
American expatriate baseball players in Venezuela
Tigres de Aragua players
Tucson Padres players
Yaquis de Obregón players
American expatriate baseball players in Mexico
American expatriate baseball players in Australia